"The Old Man" is the 58th episode of the American television sitcom Seinfeld. It was the 18th episode of the 4th season. It aired on February 17, 1993. The episode follows Jerry, Elaine, and George as they visit elderly people through a volunteer program.

Plot
Jerry, Elaine, and George volunteer to visit elderly people. Jerry is assigned to the ill-tempered Sid Fields, Elaine is repulsed by the goiter of the woman she is visiting, and George depresses his assigned senior citizen, Ben Cantwell, by questioning his outlook on dying. George becomes interested in Sid's housekeeper after Jerry mentions that she is attractive and can not speak English.

Kramer and Newman try selling Jerry's old vinyl records to a used record store, but are dissatisfied when the owner offers them a very small amount, as the records are all by obscure artists and of minimal interest. Sid tells Jerry he is throwing away some "junk", including more old records. When Jerry invites Kramer and Newman to come pick them up, Sid gets upset at their frantic intrusion and bites Kramer's arm, causing him to jerk back and launch Sid's dentures into the sink. They are promptly destroyed after George (who is visiting to meet the housekeeper) turns on the garbage disposal, mistaking it for a light switch.

Jerry loses track of Sid when they try to take him to the dentist to replace the dentures. Kramer and Newman return to the music store with Sid's records, but the owner offers them only a slightly larger sum than before, since the records are all very common. Kramer eggs Newman into insulting the owner and a fight ensues, resulting in the records being destroyed. After discovering that the phone line in Sid’s apartment is busy, everyone rushes over, expecting him to have found his way back. Instead, they find George shirtless on the couch with the housekeeper rubbing oil on him.

Elaine is amazed when her charge recounts how she once had an affair with Mohandas Gandhi. Sid and Ben meet in Monk's, where Sid talks about the woman he was recently "fixed up" with, mentioning both her goiter and her affair with Gandhi. However, he recounts that she put milk in the tea without asking, calling it a "turn off".

Production
Lanei Chapman plays the housekeeper. In an alternate ending to this episode that was never broadcast, her character reveals that she speaks fluent English (with an accent native to New York, not Senegal), causing George to lose interest in her.

References

External links 
 

Seinfeld (season 4) episodes
1993 American television episodes